Joshua Joel Rodriguez (born December 18, 1984) is an American professional baseball infielder for the Mariachis de Guadalajara of the Mexican Baseball League. He has played in Major League Baseball (MLB) for the Pittsburgh Pirates.

Amateur career
Rodriguez attended Rice University. There, he played college baseball for the Rice Owls baseball team in the Western Athletic Conference (WAC) of the National Collegiate Athletic Association's (NCAA) Division I. He was named WAC Freshman of the Year in 2004 and the Third Team NCAA Division I All-American third baseman in 2006, the year after Rice joined Conference USA.

Professional career

Cleveland Indians
Rodriguez was selected by the Cleveland Indians in the second round of the 2006 Major League Baseball Draft. Rodriguez played for the Class AA Akron Aeros of the Eastern League (EL) in 2008, 2009, and the first part of 2010. On May 18, 2010, Rodriguez was promoted to the Class AAA Columbus Clippers of the International League (IL). He hit .293 in 86 games.

Pittsburgh Pirates
In December 2010, the Pirates selected Rodriguez with the first overall pick of the 2010 Rule 5 draft. Under the rules regarding Rule 5 players, Rodriguez had to stay on the team's major league roster for the entire 2011 season, or be offered back to the Indians.

On March 27, 2011. the Pirates announced that Rodriguez would be on the team's Opening Day roster, after infielder Pedro Ciriaco was optioned to the AAA Indianapolis Indians. Pirates general manager Neal Huntington stated Rodriguez proved during spring training that he is adept enough defensively to hold his own in the big leagues. Huntington also added that "[Rodriguez] is not your typical Rule 5 guy. He's a little better-equipped to handle the major league environment than a typical Rule 5 guy." The announcement of Rodriguez being named to the Pirates Opening Day roster came moments after he and Ciriaco helped the team defeat the Tampa Bay Rays in a spring training game by scoring on a throwing error in the bottom of the ninth inning to give the Pirates a 5-4 victory. He was designated for assignment on April 22 to make room for Brandon Wood on the roster. The Cleveland Indians reacquired him on April 29 and assigned him to AAA Columbus. However, he was traded back to Pittsburgh on June 21 for cash considerations.
In the Pirates minor league system, he played for the Indianapolis Indians of the IL and the Altoona Curve of the EL. In the 2011 season he played for Pittsburgh, Indianapolis, Altoona, and Columbus.

New York Mets
On March 29, 2012, Rodriguez signed a minor league deal with the New York Mets. Rodriguez began the year with the Binghamton Mets of the EL. He was named EL Player of the Week on April 23.

Miami Marlins
On January 27, 2014, Rodriguez signed a minor league contract with the Miami Marlins organization and was assigned to the Triple-A New Orleans Zephyrs to begin the season.

Second Stint with Mets
On March 8, 2015, Rodriguez signed a minor league deal with the New York Mets. He was assigned to the AAA Las Vegas 51s. On April 2, 2015 he was demoted to the AA Binghamton Mets.

Oakland Athletics
Rodriguez signed a minor league contract with the Oakland Athletics on November 25, 2015. He began the 2016 season with the Double-A Midland RockHounds, but was promoted to the Triple-A Nashville Sounds in late April. He became a free agent after the season, but was later re-signed to a minor league contract with the A's for 2017. He was released during spring training.

Third Stint with Mets
On April 3, 2017, Rodriguez signed a minor league deal with the New York Mets. He was assigned to the AAA Las Vegas 51s. He elected free agency on November 6, 2017.

Toros de Tijuana
On March 20, 2018, Rodriguez signed with the Toros de Tijuana of the Mexican Baseball League.

Tecolotes de los Dos Laredos
On May 3, 2018, Rodriguez was traded to the Tecolotes de los Dos Laredos of the Mexican Baseball League. He appeared in 66 games for the club, collecting 61 hits and 9 home runs. In 2019, Rodriguez slashed .312/.385/.526 with 22 home runs and 88 RBI in 117 games for the team. Rodriguez did not play in a game in 2020 due to the cancellation of the Mexican League season because of the COVID-19 pandemic.

In 2021, Rodriguez played in 53 games for Dos Laredos, batting .230/.302/.410 with 6 home runs and 24 RBI. For the 2022 season, he made 77 appearances for the Tecolotes, hitting .224/.303/.354 with 7 home runs and 35 RBI.

Mariachis de Guadalajara
On February 11, 2023, Rodriguez signed with the Mariachis de Guadalajara of the Mexican League.

See also
Rule 5 draft results

References

External links

MiLB.com player profile

1984 births
Living people
Akron Aeros players
Altoona Curve players
American expatriate baseball players in Mexico
Baseball players from Texas
Binghamton Mets players
Buffalo Bisons (minor league) players
Columbus Clippers players
Indianapolis Indians players
Kinston Indians players
Las Vegas 51s players
Mahoning Valley Scrappers players
Major League Baseball shortstops
Mexican League baseball shortstops
Mexican League baseball third basemen
Midland RockHounds players
Naranjeros de Hermosillo players
Nashville Sounds players
New Orleans Zephyrs players
People from Houston
Peoria Saguaros players
Pittsburgh Pirates players
Rice Owls baseball players
Surprise Rafters players
Tecolotes de los Dos Laredos players
Toros de Tijuana players